The 35th Annual Japan Record Awards took place at the Nippon Budokan in Chiyoda, Tokyo, December 31, 1993, starting at 6:30PM JST. The primary ceremonies were televised in Japan on TBS.

Award winners 
Japan Record Award:
Kaori Kozai for "Mugonzaka"
Best Vocalist:
Kiyoshi Maekawa
Best New Artist:
Yasuhiro Yamane
Best Album:
Mariya Takeuchi for "Quiet Life"

External links
Official Website

Japan Record Awards
Japan Record Awards
1993
Japan Record Awards
Japan Record Awards